The 2009 season of competitive association football in Malaysia.

Promotion and relegation

Pre-season

New and withdrawn teams

New teams 
 Penjara (FAM League)
 Pos Malaysia (FAM League)
 UiTM (FAM League)
 Universiti Sains Malaysia Staff (FAM League)

Withdrawn teams 
 DPMM1

Note:
1 Excluded from the competition as per FIFA rules after Football Association of Brunei Darussalam was deregistered by the Registrar of Societies.

National Team

Malaysia National Football Team

2011 AFC Asian Cup qualification 

Note: The second match between United Arab Emirates against Malaysia is held on 6 January 2010

International Friendlies

Malaysia National under-23 football team

2009 Southeast Asian Games

Group stage

Semi-final

Gold-medal match

Malaysia national under-19 football team

2009 AFF U-19 Youth Championship

Group stage

Semi final

Third place play-off

Malaysia national under-16 football team

2010 AFC U-16 Championship qualification

Group stage

League season

Super League

Premier League

FAM League

Domestic Cups

Charity Shield

FA Cup

Final 

Selangor FA win 4–1 on penalties

Malaysia Cup

Final

Malaysian clubs in Asia

Kedah

AFC Cup

Group stage

Knockout stage 

Round of 16

Johor

AFC Cup

Group stage

References